Harold William Herbert 'Harry' Courtney (1908-1936) was an Australian rugby league footballer who played in the 1930s.

A son of the rugby league legend Tedda Courtney and brother of Ed Courtney Jr., Harry played two years of first grade rugby league before his premature death. He joined the St. George club for one season before joining Canterbury-Bankstown to be coached by his famous father in 1935.

Courtney died on 6 December 1936 at Randwick, New South Wales.

References

St. George Dragons players
Canterbury-Bankstown Bulldogs players
1908 births
1936 deaths
Australian rugby league players
Rugby league second-rows
Rugby league players from Sydney